The 2015 IIHF World Women's U18 Championships was the eighth World Women's U18 Championship. The top division tournament was played in Buffalo, United States, from 5 to 12 January 2015. Twenty nations played in three levels, with promotion and relegation for the top and bottom teams at each level.

The United States won their fourth title defeating Canada in overtime in the gold medal game, with Jincy Dunne scoring on the power play.  This was the eighth consecutive final between the two nations, evening their all-time records.  The bronze medal game was also a rematch from the previous year, this time the Russians defeated the Czechs earning their first ever medal at this level.

In Division I play the French earned their first ever promotion to the top level.  They opened the tournament with a shootout win over Norway and won the rest of their games earning a trip to St. Catherines for 2016.

Format
The preliminary round is divided into two pools that placed the top four seeds into Group A, and the bottom four in Group B. The top two finishers in Group A advances directly to the semifinals, while the two remaining teams and the top two in Group B will play a quarterfinal round. The bottom two teams from Group B will play a relegation series to determine the one team that gets relegated.

Preliminary round
All times are local (UTC–5).

Group A

Group B

Relegation series
The third and fourth placed team from Group B will play a best-of-three series to determine the relegated team.

Final round

Quarterfinals

Semifinals

Fifth place game

Bronze medal game

Gold medal game

Final standings

Tournament awards
Best players selected by the directorate

Source: IIHF.com

Media All Stars

Source: IIHF.com

Statistics

Scoring leaders 

GP = Games played; G = Goals; A = Assists; Pts = Points; +/− = Plus-minus; PIM = Penalties In MinutesSource: IIHF.com

Goaltending leaders 
(minimum 40% team's total ice time)

TOI = Time on ice (minutes:seconds); GA = Goals against; GAA = Goals against average; Sv% = Save percentage; SO = ShutoutsSource: IIHF.com

Division I

Division I 'A'
The Division I 'A' tournament was played in Vaujany, France, from 4 to 10 January 2015.

Division I Qualification
The Division I Qualification tournament was played in Katowice, Poland, from 19 to 25 January 2015.  Denmark won all five games in their debut, earning promotion to the Division I 'A' tournament for 2016.

References

External links
 Official website
 AllSportDB.com Event page
 2015 IIHF World Women's U18 Championship at Eurohockey.com

IIHF World Women's U18 Championships
World
2015 in ice hockey
World
2015
January 2015 sports events in the United States
Sports competitions in Buffalo, New York
Ice hockey in New York (state)
2015 in sports in New York (state)
International sports competitions in New York (state)